Hüsker Dü is an American punk rock band.

Husker Du may also refer to:

 Hūsker Dū?, North American edition of Danish board game
 Husker du? (TV program), a Norwegian television program